Big Tyme is the second album by American hip hop group Heavy D & the Boyz. Big Tyme is also the final album to feature bandmate Trouble T Roy (Troy Dixon), who died from a fall in 1990.

Reception

The album was released in 1989 for Uptown Records and was produced by DJ Eddie F, Teddy Riley, Marley Marl, and Pete Rock.  The album was considerably more successful than the group's last album, making it to #19 on the Billboard 200 and #1 on the Top R&B/Hip-Hop Albums chart.  Three hit singles were released: "We Got Our Own Thang", "Somebody for Me", and "Gyrlz, They Love Me".

Track listing
"We Got Our Own Thang" Produced by Teddy Riley - 3:50 
"You Ain't Heard Nuttin Yet" Produced by DJ Eddie F. For the Untouchable Productions - 4:28 
"Somebody for Me" Produced by DJ Eddie F. and Nevelle For the Untouchable Productions  5:03
"Mood for Love" Produced by DJ Eddie F. For the Untouchable Productions   - 5:27 
"Ez Duz It Do It Ez" Produced by Marley Marl - 3:59 
"A Better Land" Produced by Heavy D - 4:55 
"Gyrlz, They Love Me" Produced by Marley Marl and Heavy D - 4:52 
"More Bounce"Produced by DJ Eddie F. For the Untouchable Productions - 4:53 
"Big Tyme" Produced by DJ Eddie F. For the Untouchable Productions - 4:56 
"Flexin" Produced by DJ Eddie F. For the Untouchable Productions - 3:51 
"Here We Go Again, Y'all" Produced by Marley Marl - 4:05 
"Let It Flow" Produced by DJ Eddie F. For the Untouchable Productions - 3:45

Charts

Weekly charts

Year-end charts

Certifications

See also
List of number-one R&B albums of 1989 (U.S.)

References

External links
 

1989 albums
Heavy D albums
Albums produced by Pete Rock
Albums produced by Teddy Riley
Albums produced by Marley Marl
Uptown Records albums
MCA Records albums